William, Willie, Willy, or Bill Peters may refer to:
William Peters (Australian politician) (1903–1978), member of the New South Wales Legislative Council
William Peters (lawyer) (1702–1786), American lawyer and judge from Philadelphia
William Peters (painter) (1742–1814), British painter
W. S. Peters (1867–1933), American baseball player
William Peters (journalist) (1921–2007), American journalist and documentary filmmaker
William Peters , mayor of Cape Town from 1963 to 1965
William Peters (sport shooter), Colombian Olympic shooter
William H. Peters (1825–?), Wisconsin legislator
William John Peters (1863–1942), American explorer and scientist
William L. Peters (1835–1916), American violin maker
William Wesley Peters (1912–1991), architect
Willy Peters (1915–1976), Swedish actor and director
Willie Peters (born 1979), rugby league player
William Theodore Peters (1862–1904), American poet and actor
William Thompson Peters (1805–1885), American politician
William Peters (diplomat) (1923–2014), British diplomat and founder of Jubilee 2000
Bill Peters (footballer) (1898–1957), Australian footballer
Bill Peters (ice hockey) (born 1965), Canadian ice hockey player and coach

See also
William Peter McGivern (1918–1982), author who sometimes wrote as Bill Peters